The tournament was announced right after the 2020-21 Qatar Stars League ended, were the bottom 8 teams from the Qatar Stars League and the entire Qatari Second Division participate.

History 

 2021 : Al Sailiya 1-0  Al Markhiya
 2022 : Al-Arabi SC 3-2 Lusail SC

References 

Football cup competitions in Qatar